The 2010–11 season was FK Partizan's 5th season in Serbian SuperLiga. This article shows player statistics and all matches (official and friendly) that the club had and who played during the 2010–11 season.

Tournaments

Players

Squad information

Top scorers

Includes all competitive matches. The list is sorted by shirt number when total goals are equal.

Squad statistics

Competitions

Serbian SuperLiga

Overview

League table

Matches

Serbian Cup

Final

1 The match was abandoned in the 83rd minute with Partizan leading 2-1 when Vojvodina walked off to protest the quality of the officiating. Originally, this was declared the final score and the Cup was awarded to Partizan, but on May 16, 2011, after further investigation from Serbian FA concerning the match, the result was officially registered as a 3–0 win to Partizan.

UEFA Champions League

Second qualifying round

Third qualifying round

Play-off round

Group stage

Friendlies

Transfers

In

Out

Sponsors

External links
 Official website
 Partizanopedia 2010-11  (in Serbian)

FK Partizan seasons
Partizan
Partizan
Serbian football championship-winning seasons